Minnesota State Highway 32 (MN 32) is a  highway in west-central and northwest Minnesota, which runs from its intersection with State Highway 34 in Tansem Township near Barnesville and continues north to its intersection with State Highway 11 at Greenbush in Roseau County.

Route description
State Highway 32 serves as a north–south route between Tansem Township, Twin Valley, Fertile, Red Lake Falls, Thief River Falls, and Greenbush in west-central and northwest Minnesota.

The route is also known as:
1st Street in Ulen
1st Street in Twin Valley
Mill Street in Fertile
Main Avenue and Bridge Street in Red Lake Falls
Broadway Avenue in St. Hilaire
Main Avenue in Thief River Falls
1st Street in Middle River

Highway 32 parallels U.S. 75 and U.S. 59 throughout its route.

The route passes through the Glacial Ridge National Wildlife Refuge in Polk County, east of Crookston, west of Erskine.

History
State Highway 32 was established November 2, 1920. At this time, it ran from State Highway 8 (present-day U.S. 2) east of Crookston to Greenbush.

By 1923, the road was mostly graveled, with a section of unimproved dirt between Holt and Middle River and another north of Strathcona. All graveling was completed by 1930.

In 1933, the route was extended south, from U.S. 2 to State Highway 34 south of Rollag. This extension was graveled in its entirety.

When U.S. 59 was established in Minnesota in 1935, it ran concurrent with Highway 32 between Thief River Falls and present-day Marshall County State-Aid Highway 28 (north of Holt) until 1960.

North of U.S. 2, the highway was paved in sections throughout the 1940s.

South of U.S. 2, the first section of highway to be paved was from the junction with then-Highway 31 (now Highway 200) north of Twin Valley to a point just south of Fertile in 1937; paving was extended into both Fertile and Twin Valley in 1940, as well as from U.S. 10 to Hitterdal (although part of the latter segment was reverted to gravel in 1943). In 1948, it was paved from U.S. 10 north to Ulen, and then from Ulen to Twin Valley the following year. Paving from Highway 102 to U.S. 2 and from Rollag to U.S. 10 was done in 1952 and the final segment from Highway 34 to Rollag in 1954, making the route paved in its entirety.

Major intersections

References

External links

Highway 32 at The Unofficial Minnesota Highways Page

032
Transportation in Clay County, Minnesota
Transportation in Norman County, Minnesota
Transportation in Polk County, Minnesota
Transportation in Red Lake County, Minnesota
Transportation in Pennington County, Minnesota
Transportation in Roseau County, Minnesota